Karizma may refer to:
 Karizma (musician) (born 1970), American musician
 Karizma (Serbian band), Serbian hard rock/glam metal band
 KariZma (pop band), Bulgarian pop duo
 Hero Honda Karizma R or Hero Honda Karizma ZMR, motorcycles manufactured by Hero MotoCorp, India
 Karizma, a 2009 album by Turkish singer Mustafa Sandal

See also
Call Me Karizma, American musician
 Karizmeh, a village in Razavi Khorasan Province, Iran